Crocidura cranbrooki is a species of shrew from Northern Myanmar.

References 

Crocidura
Mammals described in 2009
Mammals of Myanmar